Sart-Chishma (Hart-Şişmä) is a rural locality (a selo) in Novokiyeshkinsky Selsoviet, Karmaskalinsky District, Bashkortostan, Russia. The population was 908 as of 2010. There are 13 streets.

Geography 
Sart-Chishma is located 26 km east of Karmaskaly (the district's administrative centre) by road. Pribelsky is the nearest rural locality.

References 

Rural localities in Karmaskalinsky District